Shantou Yuhuai Senior High School (汕头市聿怀中学 Pinyin:Yuhuai Zhongxue) was founded in 1877 in Shantou, Guangdong, China. It has over 130 years of history, which is one of the oldest schools in Shantou. The school once named as No.3 Senior High School and Dongfanghong Senior High School.

Introduction
Shantou Yuhuai Senior High School is one of the national demonstration senior high schools in Guangdong, and it is also one of the Provincial level key secondary schools. The school has two campuses, 60 teaching classes, more than 210 teachers and more than 3600 students.

History

Before the Founding of the PRC

In 1877, British missionary John Campbell built a school building, which could accommodate dozens of students. This was the predecessor of Yu Huai middle school.

In 1913, they chose another place in Shantou to build a new school building, the building could accommodate about sixty students.

In 1925, Yuhuai Senior High School was closed.

In 1929, Yuhuai Senior High School opened, and appointed Chen Zelin as president.

In 1947, Chen Zelin went to America, and Zhuo Xiaoliang was the acting president. After a summer of hard work, the number of students was one thousand and one hundred, and the number of teachers was about sixty.

After the Founding of the PRC

In 1953, Yuhuai Senior High School was changed its name to Shantou No.3 Senior High School.

In 1985, the school held an important meeting, and the people all agreed to resume the name" Yuhuai Senior High School". From then on, Yuhuai Senior High School opened a new page of its history.

Scale of the school
The school has a large digital library with more than one hundred thousand books. It also has a 200-meter ring plastic runway, an indoor sports room, a swimming pool, and a standardized counseling room. All classrooms are equipped with a multimedia computer network platform, which is composed of a multimedia computer, network access equipment, LCD projector, physical projection, etc.

International Department
The International Department of Shantou Yuhuai Senior High School was founded in 2013, and it is located in Dayang Campus of Shantou Yuhuai Senior High School. It is the first senior high school International Department in the eastern of Guangdong.

References 

Shantou
High schools in Guangdong